Kushka may refer to:

Serhetabat, Turkmenistan
Kushka, Balkh, Afghanistan
Kushk, Borujerd, Iran
Kushka (film), a 2018 Indian Kannada film